The 1972 United States presidential election in Kentucky took place on November 7, 1972, as part of the 1972 United States presidential election. Kentucky voters chose 9 representatives, or electors, to the Electoral College, who voted for president and vice president. These electors at the time were Frank Stubblefield (D), Romano L. Mazzoli (D), Gene Snyder (R), Tim Lee Carter (R), William P. Curlin Jr. (D), Carl D. Perkins (D), John Sherman Cooper (R), Marlow W. Cook (R).

Kentucky was won by incumbent President Richard Nixon (R–California), with 63.77 percent of the popular vote, against George McGovern (D–South Dakota), with 34.77%. Nixon won 112 out of 120 counties in the commonwealth. 

This was the first time a Republican ever carried every county in, or even won at all, the Jackson Purchase region of Kentucky.

Results

Results by county

References

Kentucky
1972
1972 Kentucky elections